Fenerbahçe Women's Volleyball, commonly known as Fenerbahçe, are the women's volleyball department of Fenerbahçe SK, a major Turkish multi-sport club based in Istanbul, Turkey. They play their matches at the 7.000-seated Burhan Felek Sport Hall. Fenerbahçe compete in the Turkish Women's Volleyball League, which is considered to be one of the best and most competitive leagues in the world.

Founded in 1928, Fenerbahçe are one of the best volleyball teams in Turkey and in the world. They were crowned World Champions by winning the FIVB Volleyball Women's Club World Championship undefeated in 2010, thus achieving the first Intercontinental Quadruple ever in Turkish volleyball history, after having won the Turkish League, Turkish Cup, and the Turkish Super Cup in 2010. Fenerbahçe became the first Turkish team to claim a World Championship title. After being runners-up in the CEV Champions League in 2010, Fenerbahçe finally were crowned European Champions in the 2011–12 season after defeating French powerhouse RC Cannes in three straight sets (25–14, 25–22, and 25–20) in the final game. The club also reached the third place of the Champions League twice, in the 2010–11 and 2015–16 seasons.

Fenerbahçe also won the CEV Cup by defeating Russia's Uralochka-NTMK Ekaterinburg 3–0 (25-11, 28-26, 25-22) in the 2014 finals in front of their passionate home crowd, thus writing volleyball history as the men's team won another continental title, the CEV Challenge Cup, the very same day. By achieving this unparalleled feat, Fenerbahçe became the first and only sports club in Turkey and one of a few in Europe with European titles won in both the men's and women's volleyball departments.

In Turkey the club have won 13 Turkish Championship titles (5 in the current Turkish Women's Volleyball League and 8 in the former Turkish Women's Volleyball Championship), 3 Turkish Cups, and 3 Turkish Super Cups, among others.

Previous names
 Fenerbahçe (1928, 1954–2007)
 Fenerbahçe Acıbadem (2007–2011)
 Fenerbahçe Universal (2011–2012)
 Fenerbahçe (2012–2014)
 Fenerbahçe Grundig (2014–2016)
 Fenerbahçe (2016–2018)
 Fenerbahçe Opet (2018-present)

History
The women's volleyball department was founded in 1928 by Sabiha Gürayman who, as a young woman, played for the club's men's volleyball team, and was the first woman architect in Turkey. However, the section was closed due to lack of opponents. In 1954, a new era started with assistance from Çamlıca Girls' High School (tr). Starting in 1958, the girls won eight Turkish Championships among many other titles. In 1977, the department was closed again until 1989, this time due to insufficient funds. In 1993, the team was promoted from the Istanbul First League to the Turkish Second League. The following year, they played in the Turkish First League. However, they were relegated to the Turkish Second League in the 1995–96 season.

Fenerbahçe returned to the Turkish First League in the 2002–03 season, and were runners-up in the 2006–07 season. The senior team was renamed as Fenerbahçe Acıbadem due to a sponsorship agreement with the Acıbadem Healthcare Group from 2007 to 2011. The Yellow Angels were runners-up after Eczacıbaşı SK in the 2007–08 season, too. They gained the ninth Turkish title in their history in the 2008–09 season, after defeating their archrivals Eczacıbaşı SK in the finals (3–2, 0–3, 3–1, 3–1), which was their first ever title in the league's current format that had started with the 1984–85 season.

Fenerbahçe's women's team shone in the 2009–10 season as the Yellow Angels finished the first round of the 2009–10 Turkish League undefeated in 22 matches (setting a 66:2 set ratio record), and reached the Final Four of the 2009–10 CEV Women's Champions League undefeated. The team then beat the host team RC Cannes in a thrilling five-setter, but eventually lost to Volley Bergamo in five sets in the final, even though they came back after falling two sets down: 22–25, 21–25, 25–22, 25–20, 9–15. Yekaterina Gamova was named the best scorer and Nataša Osmokrović was chosen the best server of the tournament.

The star-studded team of Fenerbahçe were on top of the world on 21 December 2010 in Doha, Qatar after beating South American titleholders Sollys Osasco 3–0 (25–23, 25–22, 25–17) to become the first team in 16 years to claim the 2010 FIVB Women's Club World Championship where Katarzyna Skowrońska was named the MVP and Best Scorer, while Eda Erdem Dündar was the Best Server.

In 2011, Fenerbahçe SK organized the Champions League Final Four in the Burhan Felek Sports Hall in Istanbul, however, in the semi-final the Yellow Angels lost to Turkish rivals Vakıfbank in a heart-breaking five setter (25–19, 21–25, 25–21, 19–25, 11–15), and lost the chance to be the very first team in Turkish volleyball history to win the Champions League title. The Yellow Angels settled for the third place after beating Scavolini Pesaro in four sets (14–25, 25–21, 25–21, 25–21), thanks to the national heroines Seda Tokatlıoğlu, Naz Aydemir and Eda Erdem Dündar.

In 2012 the club won the CEV Volleyball Champions League, which was organized in Baku on 24–25 March 2012, having defeated French powerhouse RC Cannes in the final in three straight sets (25–14, 25–22, and 25–20). Kim won the MVP award and the Best Scorer award, while Naz Aydemir was named the Best Setter.

Honours

Worldwide competitions
  FIVB Volleyball Women's Club World Championship
 Winners (1): 2010
 Third place (2): 2012, 2021
 Intercontinental Quadruple
 Winners (1): 2010

European competitions
  CEV Champions League
 Winners (1):  2011–12
 Runners-up (1):  2009–10
 Third place (3): 2010–11, 2015–16, 2021–22
  CEV Cup
 Winners (1): 2013–14
 Runners-up (1): 2012–13

Domestic competitions
 Turkish Women's Volleyball League
 Winners (5): 2008–09, 2009–10, 2010–11, 2014–15, 2016–17
 Runners-up (5): 2006–07, 2007–08, 2013–14, 2015–16, 2020–21
 Third place (4): 2011–12, 2012–13, 2017–18, 2018–19
 Turkish Women's Volleyball Championship (defunct)
 Winners (8): 1956, 1957, 1958, 1959, 1960, 1968, 1969, 1972
 Runners-up (3): 1961, 1973, 1975
 Third place (3): 1962, 1974, 1977
 Turkish Cup
 Winners (3): 2009–10, 2014–15, 2016–17
 Runners-up (3): 2008–09, 2013–14, 2018–19, 2021–22	
 Turkish Super Cup
 Winners (4): 2009, 2010, 2015, 2022
 Runners-up (3): 2011, 2014, 2017
 Turkish Federation Cup (defunct)
 Winners (2): 1960, 1977 
 Runners-up (1): 1966

Regional competitions
 Istanbul League (defunct)
 Winners (10): 1955–56, 1956–57, 1957–58, 1958–59, 1960–61, 1967–68, 1968–69, 1970–71, 1971–72, 1972–73
 Runners-up (5): 1959–60, 1962–63, 1969–70, 1973–74, 1974–75
 Third place (7): 1954–55, 1961–62, 1963–64, 1964–65, 1965–66, 1966–67, 1976–77

Team Roster
Season 2022–2023

Season by season

Home halls
This is a list of the home halls the senior team played at in the recent years.

1 CEV Champions League games only.

Notable players

Domestic Players

 Elif Ağca Öner
 Ergül Avcı
 Naz Aydemir Duygu Bal
 Meryem Boz
 Çiğdem Can Rasna
 Pelin Çelik
 Merve Dalbeler
 Gökçen Denkel
 Songül Dikmen
 Eda Erdem Seda Eryüz
 Nihan Güneyligil
 Özge Kırdar
 Yağmur Koçyiğit
 Aysun Özbek
 Özlem Özçelik
 Nilay Özdemir
 İpek Soroğlu
 Seda Tokatlıoğlu
 Polen Uslupehlivan
 Dicle Nur Babat Meliha İsmailoğlu Ezgi Dilik
 Gizem Güreşen Karadayı
 Şeyma Ercan
 Melis Yılmaz
 Damla Çakıroğlu
 Merve Tanyel
 Beliz Başkır Fatma Yıldırım
 Sıla Çalışkan
 Bahar Toksoy
 İpar Özay Kurt Ceren Kestirengöz
 Pınar Eren Gizem Örge Tutku Burcu Yüzgenç Buse Ünal Cansu ÇetinEuropean Players

 Valeriya Korotenko
 Oksana Parkhomenko
 Polina Rahimova

 Marina Tumas

 Frauke Dirickx

 Dobriana Rabadžieva

 Aneta Havlíčková

 Nataša Osmokrović
 Mia Jerkov

 Christiane Fürst

 Christina Bauer

 Alice Blom
 Maret Balkestein-Grothues

 Lucia Bosetti
 Eleonora Lo Bianco

 Berenika Okuniewska
 Katarzyna Skowrońska
 Katarzyna Skorupa

 Yekaterina Gamova
 Lioubov Sokolova
 Anna Lazareva Arina Fedorovtseva Anja Spasojević
 Brankica Mihajlović
 Bianka Buša
 Mina PopovićNon-European Players

 Ana Biatriz Chagas
 Fabiana Claudino
 Fofão Souza
 Fernanda Garay
 Marianne Steinbrecher
 Paula Pequeno
 Tatiana Santos
 Natália Pereira
 Ana Cristina Souza''
 Macris Carneiro

 Madelaynne Montaño

 Kim Yeon-koung

 Nootsara Tomkom

 Lindsey Berg
 Therese Crawford
 Nicole Davis
 Alisha Glass
 Kim Glass
 Kristin Hildebrand
 Logan Tom
 Christa Harmotto
 Jordan Thompson
 Kelsey Robinson

 Samantha Bricio

 Melissa Vargas

Players written in italic still play for the club.

Sponsorship and kit manufacturers

1 Main sponsorship
2 Back sponsorship
3 Lateral sponsorship
4 Short sponsorship

See also
 Fenerbahçe SK
 Fenerbahçe Men's Volleyball

References

External links
  
 

Fenerbahçe Volleyball
Women's volleyball teams in Turkey
Volleyball clubs established in 1928
1928 establishments in Turkey